Luis Salinas (born 11 October 1958) is a Nicaraguan weightlifter. He competed in the men's heavyweight I event at the 1984 Summer Olympics.

References

1958 births
Living people
Nicaraguan male weightlifters
Olympic weightlifters of Nicaragua
Weightlifters at the 1984 Summer Olympics
Place of birth missing (living people)